The Austria women's national under-20 volleyball team represents Austria in international women's volleyball competitions and friendly matches under the age 20 and it is ruled by the Austrian Volleyball Federation That is an affiliate of Federation of International Volleyball FIVB and also a part of European Volleyball Confederation CEV.

Results

FIVB U20 World Championship
 Champions   Runners up   Third place   Fourth place

CEV Europe U19 Championship
 Champions   Runners up   Third place   Fourth place

Team

Current squad
The Following players is the Austrian players that Competed in the 2018 Women's U19 Volleyball European Championship Qualifications

References

External links
  Volleyball Association of Austria 

Volleyball
National women's under-20 volleyball teams
Volleyball in Austria